The women's division of the 2021 PNVF Champions League was held from November 20 to 25, 2021. This is the inaugural edition of the PNVF Champions League. The winner of this tournament will be the country’s representative to the Asian Women’s Club Volleyball Championships in May next year. F2 Logistics Cargo Movers are the inaugural champions.

Participating teams
The 2021 PNVF Champions League has six participating teams including non-Premier Volleyball League teams Baguio Lady Highlanders and California Precision Sports. The latter is a team composed of high school students.

Format
Originally, the participating teams were to be drawn into two groups of at most four teams for the preliminary round, which was to use a single round robin format. The teams would have advance to the quarterfinals with the fixtures determined by their finishing in their respective pools. The winning teams advance to the semifinals and the losing teams to the classification phase. The semifinals winners would have figured in the gold medal match and the losing sides would play against each other to determine the third best finishing team.

This format was scrapped after the withdrawal of a team from the tournament which originally had seven entrants. The tournament format was revised and adopted a single-round robin format, with all teams in a single pool, with no play-off phase.

Draw
Seven teams originally entered the 2021 PNVF Champions League. They were drawn into two groups, Pool A and Pool B.
Sta. Lucia Lady Realtors which was drawn in Pool B withdrew after the draw. The two pools were scrapped.

Tournament
All times are Philippine Standard Time (UTC+08:00).

|}
Source: PNVF

|}

Final standing

Awards

Most Valuable Player
 Kim Kianna Dy (F2 Logistics Cargo Movers)
Best Setter
 Iris Tolenada (F2 Logistics Cargo Movers)
Best Outside Spikers
 Frances Xinia Molina (Petro Gazz Angels)
 Aleona Denise Santiago-Manabat (Chery Tiggo 7 Pro Crossovers)

Best Middle Blockers
 Abigail Maraño (F2 Logistics Cargo Movers)
 Maika Angela Ortiz (Chery Tiggo 7 Pro Crossovers)
Best Opposite Spiker
 Kim Kianna Dy (F2 Logistics Cargo Movers)
Best Libero
 Dawn Nicole Macandili (F2 Logistics Cargo Movers)

Source: Tiebreaker Times

See also
2021 PNVF Champions League for Men

References

2021 in Philippine sport
PNVF Champions League